The 1880 United States elections occurred during the Third Party System, and elected the members of the 47th United States Congress. Republicans retained the Presidency and took control of the House. An unclear partisan situation prevailed in the Senate. As the first presidential election after the end of Reconstruction, this election saw the first occurrence of the Democratic Party sweeping the Southern United States; the party would carry an overwhelming majority of Southern states well into the 20th century.

In the Presidential election, Republican Representative James Garfield from Ohio defeated Democratic General Winfield Hancock. Though Garfield won a clear majority of electoral votes, he won the popular vote by the smallest margin in history. Incumbent one-term Republican President Rutherford B. Hayes declined to seek re-election. Garfield emerged as the dark horse Republican nominee following the 1880 Republican National Convention, prevailing on the 36th ballot over former President Ulysses S. Grant, Maine Senator James G. Blaine, and Ohio Senator John Sherman. Hancock took the nomination at the 1880 Democratic National Convention on the second ballot, defeating Delaware Senator Thomas F. Bayard and several other candidates. Garfield was the first sitting member of Congress to be elected president, and remains the only sitting member of the House to win a presidential election.

Republicans picked up several seats in the House, taking a majority of the chamber for the first time since the 1874 elections.

In the Senate, Republicans made small gains at the expense of the Democrats, but neither party had a majority due to the presence of an independent Senator and a Readjuster Senator. The two parties ultimately agreed to share power.

See also
1880 United States presidential election
1880 United States House of Representatives elections
1880–81 United States Senate elections

References

 
1880